Servicios Aéreos Rutas Oriente, S.A. de C.V. (commonly known as SARO) was an airline based in Monterrey, Mexico. The airline was established in 1991 and had its first flight on March 18 of that year. Due to their low prices, SARO was one of the first low-cost airlines in Mexico and America. It operated scheduled and charter flights throughout the Mexican Republic. SARO ceased all operations in 1995.

Airline motto
The airline's motto, "Una Aerolínea con todo... para todos!" ("An airline with everything... for everybody!"), embodied the "low-fare" nature of the airline, uncommon in Mexico at that time.

Difficulties and struggles
SARO was one of the first low-cost domestic airlines, starting many years before the modern ones. However, it was plagued by unfavorable conditions, strong competition from more established airlines such as Mexicana and Aeromexico (which at the time were both part of the government-run CINTRA) as well as from TAESA, owned by then-Secretary of Tourism Carlos Hank González. It was founded by private investors led by Samuel Rodriguez from Monterrey, Mexico who owned a bus company. However, the large operating costs of a scheduled airline against many difficulties, some placed by the established operators at the government-owned CINTRA, others by the official fuel supplier and the governmental airport operators conglomerate (ASA), were impossible to overcome.

Concurrently, many corners were cut. Crews consisted of captains with varying experience, together with an inexperienced co-pilot (at the time, the concept of pilot-flying and pilot-assisting were not truly present). The captain was the only one truly in command, with the co-pilot merely being present by requirement; almost all take-offs and landings were made by the captains. Training was limited and performed in an old-fashioned way by an experienced Chief of Pilots imparting practice on captains and first officers as well. Equipment was decrepit and often second-hand. Maintenance was performed in other countries because of insufficient infrastructure in Mexico. It was common for flights to carry one or two mechanics on board for routine maintenance (and frequent minor repairs). Some of these mechanics were from Mexicana, and were working in their "spare time", due to their familiarity with old Boeing equipment.

Many times, the flights became increasingly delayed for various reasons: lack of equipment due to maintenance or various failures, or lack of fuel due to debts with the official supplier (NACOA). In addition, many airports assigned SARO planes undesirable embarkment and disembarkment times, which resulted in passenger discomfort and dissatisfaction. As a result, SARO's only true selling-point was its low fares, frequently less than a third of those of the two major national airlines.

By the end of its troubled and short career, SARO was nearly bankrupt, with high debt, failing equipment, and several serious incidents. Delays were very frequent, and crews were forced to make unplanned stops at intermediate points directed by their management, in order to pick up more passengers to fill nearly-empty flights. By 1993, SARO was banned from flying to the U.S. due to several safety violations. The 1994 Mexican peso crisis proved to be the airline's death-knell.

Incident
In 1994, at Poza Rica, Veracruz, a SARO Boeing 737 overshot (touched down more than half the length of the already short runway) and overran the end of the single Runway 13, stopping close to the seashore. The extreme braking blocked the brakes, skidding the tires, blowing all four main tires, which almost caught fire and damaged the wheels. The terrified passengers disembarked safely with some help from airport and Pemex personnel. No one was hurt, but the plane was carrying a group of children returning to Ciudad del Carmen. Many families became infuriated with the airline, ending the last remaining confidence of the public. To add insult to injury, the inexperienced mechanics at the airport damaged the wing fuel tanks when trying to raise the 737 on jacks in an attempt to repair the landing gear as soon as possible, to be able to move the plane. That damage delayed the maneuver, which resulted in the crippled plane giving a bad image for several days to other companies' arriving flights.

Destinations
 Acapulco - General Juan N. Álvarez International Airport
 Cancun - Cancún International Airport
 Ciudad del Carmen - Ciudad del Carmen International Airport
 Culiacan - Federal de Bachigualato International Airport
 Guadalajara - Don Miguel Hidalgo y Costilla International Airport
 León - Del Bajío International Airport
 Mazatlán - General Rafael Buelna International Airport
 Mexico City - Benito Juarez International Airport
 Miami - Miami International Airport
 Minatitlán - Minatitlán/Coatzacoalcos National Airport
 Monterrey - General Mariano Escobedo International Airport
 Orlando - Orlando International Airport
 Puebla - Hermanos Serdán International Airport
 Reynosa - General Lucio Blanco International Airport
 Tampico - General Francisco Javier Mina International Airport
 Tepic - Amado Nervo International Airport
 Tijuana - General Abelardo L. Rodríguez International Airport
 Torreón - Francisco Sarabia International Airport

Fleet
All the aircraft ever operated by SARO:

Services
The airline offered complimentary soft drinks, juices, beers and snacks on most of its flights.

References

External links
 Timetable images
 Images of SARO

Airlines established in 1991
Airlines disestablished in 1995
Companies based in Monterrey
Defunct airlines of Mexico
1995 disestablishments in Mexico
1991 establishments in Mexico